Albert Dupouy (21 February 1901 – 1 December 1973) was a French rugby union player who competed in the 1924 Summer Olympics. In 1924 he won the silver medal as member of the French team.

References

External links
profile

1901 births
1973 deaths
French rugby union players
Olympic rugby union players of France
Rugby union players at the 1924 Summer Olympics
Olympic silver medalists for France
France international rugby union players
Medalists at the 1924 Summer Olympics
Sportspeople from Gironde
US Montauban players
Stade Bordelais players
20th-century French people